Bojan Đurković (born 17 October 1989) is a Croatian sports shooter. He competed in the Men's 10 metre air rifle, the men's 50 m prone rifle and men's 50 m three positions events at the 2012 Summer Olympics.

References

External links
 

1989 births
Living people
Croatian male sport shooters
Olympic shooters of Croatia
Shooters at the 2012 Summer Olympics
Sportspeople from Bjelovar
Shooters at the 2015 European Games
European Games competitors for Croatia
Mediterranean Games bronze medalists for Croatia
Competitors at the 2013 Mediterranean Games
Mediterranean Games medalists in shooting
21st-century Croatian people